Leslie Joseph Smith (24 December 1927 – 8 March 2008) was an English footballer who represented both Wolverhampton Wanderers and Aston Villa.

Smith began his professional career with Wolves, making his senior debut in April 1947. He was part of the squad that won the league title in 1953–54, although managing only four appearances during the campaign.
He played in the famous Wolves v Honved game, under the first floodlights in England. Where wolves turned around a 2-0 half time score to win 3–2 against the team, which included the great's Puskas and Yashin.

He became a regular starter in the following season, replacing the injured Jimmy Mullen as the club finished as runners-up. However, he found himself largely out of contention upon Mullen's return and so moved to Aston Villa in February 1956 for £25,000.

Smith played for Aston Villa in the 1957 FA Cup Final against Manchester United's Busby Babes, where Villa won the game 2–1 to lift the cup. However his career was cut short after an achilles injury forced him into retirement in 1960. In total, he made 130 appearances, scoring 27 goals for Villa.

Smith died on 8 March 2008, after suffering for many years from throat and bowel cancer. He is survived by his wife Mavis and son Nigel.

External links
Obituary
Stats for Aston Villa at Aston Villa Player Database

1927 births
2008 deaths
People from Halesowen
English footballers
English Football League players
Wolverhampton Wanderers F.C. players
Aston Villa F.C. players
Deaths from cancer in England
Deaths from esophageal cancer
Deaths from colorectal cancer
Association football wingers
English Football League representative players
FA Cup Final players